Northern Thunder Rugby League Club is an Australian rugby league football club based in Broadmeadows, Victoria formed in the late 1980s.They conduct teams for both Juniors & Seniors teams.

Notable Juniors
Following are player that went on to play professional first grade rugby league.
Young Tonumaipea (2014-20 Melbourne Storm & Gold Coast)
Richard Kennar (2015- Melbourne Storm, South Sydney & Brisbane)
Aaron Teroi (2016-17 Newcastle Thunder)

Other Juniors
Aaron Teroi (2014-15 Melbourne Storm U20)
Chanel Seigafo (2014-15 Melbourne Storm U20)
Sua Fa’alogo (2021- Melbourne Storm U20)

See also

Rugby league in Victoria

References

External links
 

Rugby league clubs in Melbourne
Rugby league teams in Victoria (Australia)
Sport in the City of Hume
Rugby clubs established in 1999
1999 establishments in Australia
Broadmeadows, Victoria